Strathbungo railway station was a railway station serving the village of Strathbungo, Renfrewshire, (and later the city of Glasgow),  Scotland. The station was originally part of the Glasgow, Barrhead and Kilmarnock Joint Railway.

History
The station opened on 1 December 1877, and was located close to the junction between the lines to Glasgow St Enoch via Gorbals Junction (opened the year before the station itself, in 1876) and the older route towards  (first opened in 1848 by the Glasgow, Barrhead and Neilston Direct Railway).

It closed to passengers permanently on 28 May 1962.

Today little remains of the station at rail level. The former booking office building on the bridge above was in use as a local shop until 2022 when it was demolished during work to fully electrify the line, which also involved the temporary removal of the nearby footbridge (a category C listed building).

Both lines meanwhile are still open as part of the Glasgow South Western Line, though the old route towards  has been freight-only since the closure of St Enoch station in 1966 - it now links into the West Coast Main Line at Larkfield Junction (using a section of the former Pollok and Govan Railway) as the section beyond Langside Junction onto the former City of Glasgow Union Railway was closed in 1973 and subsequently lifted.

References

Notes

Sources
 
 
 

Railway stations in Great Britain opened in 1877
Railway stations in Great Britain closed in 1962
Disused railway stations in Glasgow
Former Glasgow, Barrhead and Kilmarnock Joint Railway stations
Pollokshields
1877 establishments in Scotland
1962 disestablishments in Scotland